This is a list of notable Egyptian Americans, including both original immigrants who obtained American citizenship and their American descendants.

To be included in this list, the person must have a Wikipedia article showing they are Egyptian American or must have references showing they are Egyptian American and are notable.

Academia and science
Mohamed Atalla (1924–2009), inventor of the MOSFET, pioneer in silicon semiconductors and security systems.
Leila Ahmed (1940–present), professor
Moeness Amin, Professor and electrical engineer.
Hassan Aref, physicist who developed the concept of chaotic advection in fluid mechanics. 
Maha Ashour-Abdalla, physics and astronomy professor.
Ayaad Assaad (1948–present), microbiologist and toxicologist
Amr El Abbadi, Distinguished Professor of Computer Science at the University of California, Santa Barbara.
Farouk El-Baz (1938–present), professor and former NASA scientist who contributed to the Apollo Program.
Wafik El-Deiry, physician and cancer researcher.
Khaled Abou El Fadl, law professor, and Islamic studies program chair at University of California, Los Angeles
Taher Elgamal  (1955–present), cryptographer known as the "father of SSL"
Abbas El Gamal (1950–present), information theorist and entrepreneur. Former Chair of Stanford Electrical Engineering Department. 
 (immigrated early 1980s), entomologist, agronomist, former administrator of the United States Department of Agriculture's Animal and Plant Health Inspection Service (USDA APHIS),  administrator of the International Plant Protection Convention (IPPC).
Wafaa El-Sadr (1950–present), Professor of Public Health, Columbia University and former MacArthur Foundation Fellow
Mostafa El-Sayed (1933–present), renowned scientist and university professor
Samy El-Shall (1953-present), physical chemist and university professor
Hany Farid, Professor of computer science at Dartmouth College, pioneer in Digital forensics (Egyptian)
Medhat Haroun (1951–2012), expert on earthquake engineering
Mohamed Hashish (1947–present), mechanical engineer and inventor.
Ahmed Hassanein, Paul L. Wattelet Distinguished Professor of Nuclear Engineering, director of CMUXE, Purdue University
Essam Heggy, NASA scientist and Egyptian presidential science adviser
Saad Eddin Ibrahim (1938–present), sociologist and author
Mourad Ismail, mathematician working on orthogonal polynomials and special functions.
Rashad Khalifa (1935–1990), biochemist
Ahmed Subhy Mansour,  Islamic scholar with expertise in Islamic history, culture, theology, and politics.
Ibrahim Oweiss (1931–present), economist, international economic advisor, and professor
Rushdi Said (1920–2013), geologist
Bahgat G. Sammakia, Mechanical engineer and former President of SUNY Polytechnic Institute
Ahmed Sameh, Computer Scientist known for his contributions to parallel algorithms in numerical linear algebra.
Minouche Shafik, economist and the Director of the London School of Economics.
Emad Shahin, professor of political science.
Ahmed Tewfik (1960–present), electrical engineer, professor and college administrator.  
Nabih Youssef, structural engineer 
Ahmed Zewail (1946–2016), Nobel laureate in chemistry. 
Ahmed I. Zayed, mathematician

Arts and entertainment
Frank Agrama, director, producer and writer.
Ahmed Ahmed (1970–present), actor and comedian.
Nessa Diab, radio and TV personality and television host
Sam Esmail (1977–present), screenwriter, film and television director, and television producer
Joy Garnett (born 1965), visual artist and writer
Ronnie Khalil, stand-up comedian 
Asaad Kelada, television director
Christopher Maher (1955–present), actor and James Beard award recognized chef
Wendie Malick (1950–present), actress and fashion model, Egyptian paternal grandfather
Rami Malek (1981–present), Academy Award-winning actor
Mena Massoud (1991-present), actor
Omar Metwally (1974–present), actor
Jehane Noujaim, documentary film director
Omar Sharif (1932–2015), actor
Sammy Sheik (1981–present), actor
Diane Tuckman (1939–present), Silk artist, author and teacher
Ramy Youssef (1991–present), Golden Globe-winning actor
Zeeko Zaki (1990–present), actor and model
Joe DeRosa (1977–present), actor and comedian
Sayed Badreya (1957-present), actor
Yasmine Al Massri, actress, Egyptian mother
Omar Fadel (1977-present), composer

Business
Ramy Adeeb, founder and CEO of social curation platform Snip.it 
Allen Adham, businessman
Fadi Chehadé, founder of RosettaNet and former CEO of ICANN. 
Mohamed El-Erian (1958–present), CEO of PIMCO and former president and CEO of the Harvard Management Company
Rana el Kaliouby (1978–present), co-founder and CEO of Affectiva
Mo Gawdat,  former Chief Business Officer for Google X.
Emil Michael, former Vice President of Business and Chief Business Officer at Uber.
Adel Mahmoud (1941–2018), former President of the Vaccine division in Merck and Co.
Haim Saban, founder and CEO of Saban Capital Group, creator of Power Rangers.
Fayez Sarofim, fund manager.

Literature
Saladin Ahmed, comic book and fantasy writer.
Yussef El Guindi (1960–present), Egyptian-American playwright
Stephen Adly Guirgis, playwright
Ihab Hassan, literary theorist and writer.
Victor Hassine (1956–2008), prison writer 
Marty Makary, medical writer and New York Times bestselling author.
Matthew Shenoda, poet, writer and professor.

Media and journalism
Mona Eltahawy (1967–present), freelance journalist
Hoda Kotb (1964–present), TV news anchor and host
Ayman Mohyeldin, journalist for NBC News, formerly worked for Al Jazeera and CNN

Music
Halim El-Dabh, composer, performer, and educator
Raef Haggag, (1982–present), singer-songwriter
Kareem Salama, country music singer
Sylvain Sylvain, rock guitarist, member of the New York Dolls.

Politics
Dina Habib Powell (1973–present), philanthropist and multi-administration U.S. official
Gamal Helal (1954–present), interpreter and diplomat
Dalia Mogahed (1974–present), scholar and advisor to the U.S. President Barack Obama
Allan Mansoor, former member of the California State Assembly.
Osama El-Lissy, see

Sports
Alaa Abdelnaby (1968–present), professional basketball player
Amr Aly, retired soccer forward. 
Ahmed Elmaghraby, Olympic field hockey player.
Sherif Fayed (31 March 1992–present), American-born Egyptian former footballer, viner, actor and model. As a footballer, he last played for the Belgian club Lierse S.K.
Sam Khalifa (1963–present), former Major League Baseball player
Amir Khillah (1979–present), mixed martial artist
Tarek Morad, soccer player.
Abdel Nader (1993–present), basketball player for the Phoenix Suns.
Farida Osman (1995–present), swimmer who competed in 2012 summer Olympics
Omar Samhan (1988–present), professional basketball player
Mark Seif (1967–present), two-time World Series of Poker champion and TV show host
Amanda Sobhy, squash player.

Other
Shereef Akeel (1965–present), lawyer
Karine Bakhoum, chef
Ahmed Ibrahim, the Cupid Cabbie of New York
Michael Mina (1969–present), award-winning chef and restaurateur
Omaima Aree Nelson, murderer
Norsereddin, fictional “Egyptian” American Indian figuring in late 19th-century local legend in New York's Hudson Valley
Feisal Abdul Rauf (1948–present), Sufi imam

References

 
Egyptian